The Australian Youth Climate Coalition (AYCC) is a youth organisation in Australia. When the organisation first began, the coalition consisted of 25 other youth organisations, which included the National Union of Students amongst many, however it is now an independent organisation. The organisation aims "to build a movement of young people leading solutions to the climate crisis". They state that this is achieved through empowering and education, running strategic campaigns that win, shifting the narrative, and building a movement. AYCC works closely with Seed Indigenous Youth Climate Network.

History 
In 2004, organizations, which would later form the Youth Climate Movement, began to come together. Following on from the formation of the Canadian Youth Climate Coalition in September 2006, the Australian Youth Climate Coalition formed in November 2006 with 27 youth organizations from across the nation at a founding youth summit.

The Australian Youth Climate Coalition is a non-partisan, non-profit coalition working towards a vision of climate justice "Our vision is for a fair and just world, with a stable climate and healthy environment for our communities and future generations."

In 2009, the then Finance Minister Lindsay Tanner awarded the Australian Youth Climate Coalition's co-founders, Amanda McKenzie and Anna Rose, as well as the current National Director, Ellen Sandell, with the Environment Minister's Young Environmentalist of the Year Award for their efforts.

Campaigns 

In the 2010s since the formation of the Australian Youth Climate Coalition, the organisation frequently sent a youth delegation to the United Nations Conferences on Climate Change to advocate on behalf of young people. For the 2008 conference in Poznań, Poland, the Australian delegation travelled through ten nations to reach the summit. Similarly in December 2009, the organisation sent a second youth delegation to the 2009 United Nations Climate Change Conference along with other members of the Youth Climate Movement.

Power Shift is the name of an annual youth summit which was held in the United States for the first time in 2007. Two years later in 2009, the Australian Youth Climate Coalition, in partnership with the University of Western Sydney, GetUp and Greenpeace, organised the Australian Powershift Conference on 11 to 13 July 2009. The summit attracted 1,500 young people. Guests included former Vice President of the USA Al Gore, the swimmer Ian Thorpe and the actress Brooke Satchwell. The event concluded with a gathering outside the Sydney Opera House.

The AYCC ran regional Power Shift in 2010 in Adelaide, Canberra and Geelong.
In 2011 Power Shift was held in Brisbane and Perth with 1000 young people. The summits included a range of speakers, events and workshops.

In 2013 AYCC hosted Australia's largest ever youth climate summit in Melbourne from 13–15 July.

Youth Decide
In September 2009 the AYCC organised Youth Decide with World Vision Australia. It was Australia's first national youth climate vote. 2,000 volunteers ran 330 Youth Decide events with over 37,500 young people voting.

In September 2011 the AYCC held a second Youth Decide, giving young people the opportunity to vote on the renewable energy targets they wanted the Federal Government to set.

2010 Election Campaign
During the 2010 election campaign the AYCC mobilised hundreds of young people to put climate change back on the political agenda. This included automated phone calls to politicians, hanging out scorecards rating the three main political parties climate policies and the very popular climate elephant, which was featured widely in the media and is now used as an example of excellent grassroots election campaigning.

Meet Your Member
In 2011 the AYCC ran a campaign called Meet Your Member. This involved young people from all across the country meeting with their local MP or Senator and express their view on Climate Change. Local volunteers also collected hundreds of signatures on postcards which they presented to MP's in the meetings.

Walk for Solar
In 2012 100 young people walked 328 km over 15 days from Port Augusta to Adelaide. This major event, organised by the AYCC, was part of the wider Repower Port Augusta campaign, pushing for investment in Australia's first concentrated solar thermal plant in Port Augusta. The event gained significant national media and political attention. The chief spokesperson for the project was Daniel Spencer.

Stop Adani

Banks Campaign 
In July 2014 AYCC launched the campaign to get Westpac to rule out working with Adani at a National Summit with 200 young people in Canberra. This was the first of many of visits young people paid to Westpac bank branches and HQs. AYCC had tens of thousands of conversations with customers, and delivered the message to Westpac. All of the pressure worked, Westpac announced their updated climate policy, which not only rules out involvement in Adani but sets a pathway to transition out of thermal coal and into more renewable energy.

Funding 
The AYCC declared a gross income of $4.79 Million in 2020 from a combination of sources. The majority of AYCC funding is from donations and bequests (81%).

See also 
Community youth development
Energy Action Coalition
Youth Climate Movement

References

External links 
Official website

Climate change organisations based in Australia
Youth-led organizations
2006 establishments in Australia